The 2018 World RX of the United States was the tenth round of the fifth season of the FIA World Rallycross Championship. The event was held at the Circuit of the Americas, in Austin, Texas.

Supercar 

Source

Heats

Semi-finals 

 Semi-Final 1

 Semi-Final 2

Final

Standings after the event 

Source

 Note: Only the top five positions are included.

References 

|- style="text-align:center"
|width="35%"|Previous race:2018 World RX of Latvia
|width="40%"|FIA World Rallycross Championship2018 season
|width="35%"|Next race:2018 World RX of Germany
|- style="text-align:center"
|width="35%"|Previous race:-
|width="40%"|World RX of USA
|width="35%"|Next race:-
|- style="text-align:center"

United States of America|USA
World RX